Antonio Morese (9 December 1935 – 5 December 2021), known professionally as Toni Santagata, was an Italian folk singer, composer, comedian, and actor. He was sometimes credited as Tony Santagata.

Life and career 

Born in Sant'Agata di Puglia, Foggia, Santagata  debuted as a comedian at the Derby Club in Milan, with the show Toni Santagata e il suo cabaret, later also released as an album. In the following years he embraced  folk music, both recording  some classics of the Apulian tradition and composing songs. In 1973 Santagata won the folk section of Canzonissima with "Lu maritiello"; the song was also his major hit, peaking at the sixth place on the Italian hit parade. 

Santagata died on 5 December 2021, at the age of 85.

Discography
Album  
 
 1968 - La vita di Padre Pio  
 1969 - Ciccillo Provolone  
 1970 - Toni Santagata, le sue canzoni, il suo cabaret 
 1975  - Lu maritiello ed altre canzoni  
 1975 - Vino Vino  
 1976 - Festa grande   
 1977 - Lu maritiello ed altri successi  
 1982 -  Squadra Grande  
 1982 - Quant'è bello lu primm'ammore  
 1983 - Unicus  
 1984  - Ti mando un fax  
 1994  - Storie italiane  
 2002  -  Padre Pio  
 2006  - Idee da cantare  
 2010  - Quant'è bello lu primm'ammore e altri successi

References

External links

 
 

1935 births
2021 deaths
People from the Province of Foggia
Italian folk singers
Italian male singer-songwriters
Italian singer-songwriters
Italian comedians
Italian male film actors
Italian male stage actors